The 1905 Prima Categoria season was won by Juventus.

Regulation
Following the affiliation to the FIFA, the Italian Football Federation improved its championship with new regulations. 

Home and away matches replaced the one-leg format.

The challenge round was abolished and a national final group was introduced.

Qualifications

Piedmont

|}

The results were decided after F.B.C. Torinese's forfeit.

Lombardy
Played on February 12 and 19

|}

Liguria
Played on February 5 and 19

|}

Final round

Final classification

Results

References and sources
Almanacco Illustrato del Calcio - La Storia 1898-2004, Panini Edizioni, Modena, September 2005

1905
1904–05 in European association football leagues
1904–05 in Italian football